USS Ford County (LST-772) was an  built for the United States Navy during World War II. Named after counties in Illinois and Kansas, she was the only U.S. Naval vessel to bear the name.

LST-772 was laid down on 3 August 1944 at Seneca, Illinois, by the Chicago Bridge & Iron Company; launched on 24 October 1944; sponsored by Mrs. Elsie Jane Woodlief Arrington; and commissioned on 13 November 1944.

Service history
During World War II, LST-772 was assigned to the Asiatic-Pacific theater and participated in the assault and occupation of Okinawa Gunto from April through June 1945. Following the war, she performed occupation duty in the Far East until early December 1945. The ship was placed out of commission, in reserve, on 3 July 1946 and assigned to the Columbia River Group of the U.S. Pacific Reserve Fleet. Recommissioned on 3 November 1950, she saw extensive service during the Korean War. On 1 July 1955 she was redesignated USS Ford County (LST-772). Ford County was destroyed as a target ship on 19 March 1958 and struck from the Naval Vessel Register that same day.
 
LST-772 earned one battle star for World War II service and six for Korean War service.

See also
 List of United States Navy LSTs
 Ford County, Illinois
 Ford County, Kansas

References

 
 

LST-542-class tank landing ships
World War II amphibious warfare vessels of the United States
Cold War amphibious warfare vessels of the United States
Korean War amphibious warfare vessels of the United States
Ships built in Seneca, Illinois
Ford County, Illinois
Ford County, Kansas
1944 ships
Ships sunk as targets
Maritime incidents in 1958